Wood finishing refers to the process of refining or protecting a wooden surface, especially in the production of furniture where typically it represents between 5 and 30% of manufacturing costs.

Finishing is the final step of the manufacturing process that gives wood surfaces desirable characteristics, including enhanced appearance and increased resistance to moisture and other environmental agents. Finishing can also make wood easier to clean and keep it sanitized, sealing pores that can be breeding grounds for bacteria.  Finishing can also influence other wood properties, for example tonal qualities of musical instruments and hardness of flooring. In addition, finishing provides a way of giving low-value woods the appearance of ones that are expensive and difficult to obtain.

Planning the finish 

Finishing of wood requires careful planning to ensure that the finished piece looks attractive, performs well in service and meets safety and environmental requirements. Planning for finishing begins with the design of furniture. Care should be taken to ensure that edges of furniture are rounded so they can be adequately coated and are able to resist wear and cracking. Careful attention should also be given to the design and strength of wooden joints to ensure they do not open-up in service and crack the overlying finish. Care should also be taken to eliminate recesses in furniture, which are difficult to finish with some systems, especially UV-cured finishes.

Planning for wood finishing also involves thinking about the properties of the wood being finished, as these can greatly affect the appearance and performance of finishes, and also the type of finishing system that will give the wood the desired characteristics. For example, woods that show great variation in colour between sapwood and heartwood or within heartwood may require a preliminary staining step to reduce colour variation. Alternatively, the wood can be bleached to remove the natural colour of the wood and then stained to the desired colour. Woods that are coarse textured such as oaks and other ring-porous hardwoods may need to be filled before they are finished to ensure the coating can bridge the pores and resist cracking. The pores in ring-porous woods more readily absorb pigmented stain, and advantage can be taken of this to highlight the wood's grain. Some tropical woods,  such as rosewood (Dalbergia nigra), cocobolo (Dalbergia retusa) and African padauk (Pterocarpus soyauxii),  contain extractives such as quinones, which retard the curing of unsaturated polyester and UV-cured acrylate coatings, and so other finishing systems should be used with these species.

Planning for wood finishing also involves being aware of how the finishing process influences the end result. Careful handling of the wood is needed to avoid dents, scratches and soiling with dirt. Wood should be marked for cutting using pencil rather than ink; however, avoid hard or soft pencil. HB is recommend for face work and 2H for joint work. Care should be taken to avoid squeeze-out of glue from joints because the glue will reduce absorption of stain and finish. Any excess glue should be carefully removed to avoid further damage to the wood. 

Wood’s moisture content affects the staining of wood. Changes in wood moisture content can result in swelling and shrinkage of wood which can stress and crack coatings. Both problems can be avoided by storing wood indoors in an environment where it can equilibriate to a recommended moisture content (6 to 8%) that is similar to that of the intended end use of the furniture.

Finally, consideration needs to be given to whether the finished wood will come into contact with food, in which case a food-safe finish should be used, local environmental regulations governing the use of finishes, and recycling of finished wood at the end of its life.

Sanding 

Sanding is carried out before finishing to remove defects from the wood surface that will affect the appearance and performance of finishes that are subsequently applied to the wood. These defects include cutter marks and burns, scratches and indentations, small glue spots and raised grain. Sanding should not be used to eliminate larger defects such as gouges, and various forms of discolouration. Other techniques are used to remove these defects (see below).

The key to preparing a defect free surface is to develop a sanding schedule that will quickly eliminate defects and leave the surface smooth enough so that tiny scratches produced by sanding cannot be seen when the wood is finished. A sanding schedule usually begins with sandpaper that is coarse enough to remove larger defects (typically 80 or 100 grit, but sometimes higher if the surface is already quite smooth), and progresses through a series of sandpaper grades that gradually remove the sanding scratches created by the previous sanding steps. A typical sanding schedule prior to wood finishing might involve sanding wood along the grain with the following grades of sandpaper, 80, 100, 120, 150 and finishing with 180 and sometimes 220 grit. The precise sanding schedule is a matter of trial and error because the appearance of a sanded surface depends on the wood you are sanding and the finish that will subsequently be applied to the wood. According to Nagyszalanczy, coarse grained woods with large pores such as oak hide sanding scratches better than fine grained wood and hence with such species it may be possible to use 180 or even 150 grit sandpaper as the final step in the sanding schedule. Conversely, sanding scratches are more easily seen in finer grained, harder woods and also end-grain, and hence, they require finer sandpaper (220 grit) during the final sanding stage. The sandpaper selected for the final sanding stage affects the colour of stained wood, and therefore when staining is part of finishing avoid sanding the wood to a very smooth finish. On the other hand, according to Nagyszalanczy if you are using an oil-based finish, it is desirable to sand the wood using higher grit sandpaper (400 grit) because oil tends to highlight sanding scratches. 

Sanding is very good at removing defects at wood surfaces, but it creates a surface that contains minute scratches in the form of microscopic valleys and ridges, and also slivers of wood cell wall material that are attached to the underlying wood. These sanding ridges and slivers of wood swell and spring-up, respectively, when sanded wood is finished with water-based finishes, creating a rough fuzzy surface. This defect is known as grain raising. It can be eliminated by wetting the surface with water, leaving the wood to dry and then lightly sanding the wood to remove the ‘raised grain’.

Removing larger defects 

Larger defects that interfere with wood finishing include dent, gouges, splits and glue spots and smears. These defects should also be removed before finishing, otherwise they will affect the quality of the finished furniture or object. However, it is difficult to completely eliminate large defects from wood surfaces.

Removing dents from wood surfaces is quite straightforward as pointed out by Flexner. Add a few droplets of demineralized water to the dent and let it soak in. Then put a clean cloth over the dent and place the tip of a hot iron on the cloth that lies immediately above the dent, taking great care not to burn the wood. The transfer of heat from the iron to the wood will cause compressed fibres in the dent to recover their original dimensions. As a result the dent will diminish in size or even disappear completely, although removal of large dents may require a number of wetting and heating cycles. The wood in the recovered dent should then be dried and sanded smooth to match the surrounding wood.

Gouges and holes in wood are more difficult to repair than dents because wood fibres have been cut, torn and removed from the wood. Larger gouges and splits are best repaired by patching the void with a piece of wood that matches the colour and grain orientation of the wood under repair. Patching wood requires skill, but when done properly it is possible to create a repair that is very difficult to see. An alternative to patching is filling (sometimes known as stopping). Numerous coloured fillers (putties and waxes) are produced commercially and are coloured to match different wood species. Successful filling of voids in wood requires the filler to precisely match the colour and grain pattern of the wood around the void, which is difficult to achieve in practice. Furthermore, filled voids do not behave like wood during subsequent finishing steps, and they age differently to wood. Hence, repairs to wood using fillers may noticeable. Therefore filling is best used with opaque finishes rather than semitransparent finishes, which allow the grain of the wood to be seen.

Glue smears and droplets are sometimes present around the joints of furniture. They can be removed using a combination of scraping, scrubbing and sanding. These approaches remove surface glue, but not the glue beneath the wood surface. Sub-surface glue will reduce the absorption of stain by wood, and may alter the scratch pattern created by sanding. Both these effects will influence the way in which the wood colours when stains are used to finish the wood. To overcome this problem it may be necessary to locally stain and touch-up areas previously covered by glue to ensure that the finish on such areas matches that of the surrounding wood.

Bleaching and removal of stains 
Wood surfaces are occasionally affected by various organic and inorganic stains. Sometimes such stains enhance the colour and appearance of wood. For example, oak wood affected by the beef-steak fungus has a deep rich, attractive, brown colour and there is no reason to remove the stain from the wood prior to finishing. The same applies to spalted wood whose attractive appearance is again caused by fungi. On the other hand some fungal stains and those caused by the reaction of iron with wood can disfigure wood. These stains can be removed from wood using bleach. Bleaches are also occasionally used to reduce the difference in colour between lighter sapwood and heartwood and also colour variation within heartwood. Such bleaching make it easier to achieve a uniformly coloured wood when the wood is subsequently coloured with pigmented stains and dyes (see below). Furthermore, the natural colours of wood fade when wood is exposed to sunlight, and more permanent colours can be created by bleaching wood to remove its natural colour and then re-colouring the wood using artificial, light-fast, stains.

The bleaches used to remove unwanted fungal stains from wood include two-part peroxide bleach and solutions of sodium hypochlorite. The former is particularly effective at removing the natural colour of wood before it is recoloured with pigmented stains or dyes. Oxalic acid is particularly effective at removing iron stains from wood.

Colouring wood 
Wood can be stained to change its colour or left unstained before application of lacquer, or other types of top-coats. Staining should enhance the appearance of wood by reducing colour variation between and within sapwood and heartwood. It also provides a way of giving bland looking woods such as poplar, the appearance of prized furniture woods such as ebony, mahogany or walnut.  Wood can be stained using dyes or pigmented finishes. These finishes are available in a wide variety of colours, many of which are not part of the natural colour palette of wood, for example, blues and greens. Pigmented stains tend to highlight the grain (and also sanding scratches), whereas dyes do not have this effect and are more transparent. Wood can also be coloured by exposing it to chemicals that react with the wood to form coloured compounds. Chemical staining of wood is rarely carried out because it is easier to colour wood using dye or pigmented stain, however, ammonia fuming is a chemical staining method that is still occasionally used to darken woods such as oak that contain a lot of tannins. Staining of wood is difficult to control because some parts of the wood absorb more stain than others, which leads to problems such as blotchiness and streaking. For this reason, as pointed out by Flexner, many people prefer to omit the staining step when finishing wood.

Basic wood finishing procedure
Wood finishing starts with sanding either by hand, typically using a sanding block or power sander, scraping, or planing. Imperfections or nail holes on the surface may be filled using wood putty or pores may be filled using wood filler. Often, the wood's color is changed by staining, bleaching, or any of a number of other techniques.

Once the wood surface is prepared and stained, the finish is applied. It usually consists of several coats of wax, shellac, drying oil, lacquer, varnish, or paint, and each coat is typically followed by sanding.

Finally, the surface may be polished or buffed using steel wool, pumice, rotten stone or other materials, depending on the shine desired. Often, a final coat of wax is applied over the finish to add a degree of protection.

French polishing is a finishing method of applying many thin coats of shellac using a rubbing pad, yielding a very fine glossy finish.

Ammonia fuming is a traditional process for darkening and enriching the color of white oak. Ammonia fumes react with the natural tannins in the wood and cause it to change colours. The resulting product is known as "fumed oak".

Comparison of different clear finishes
Clear finishes are intended to make wood look good and meet the demands to be placed on the finish. Choosing a clear finish for wood involves trade-offs between appearance, protection, durability, safety, requirements for cleaning, and ease of application. The following table compares the characteristics of different clear finishes. 'Rubbing qualities' indicates the ease with which a finish can be manipulated to deliver the finish desired.
Shellac should be considered in two different ways. It is used thinned with denatured alcohol as a finish and as a way to manipulate the wood's ability to absorb other finishes. The alcohol evaporates almost immediately to yield a finish that will attach to virtually any surface, even glass, and virtually any other finish can be used over it.

1 accentuates visual properties due to differences in wood grain.

Automated wood finishing methods
Manufacturers who mass-produce products implement automated flatline finish systems.  These systems consist of a series of processing stations that may include sanding, dust removal, staining, sealer and topcoat applications. As the name suggests, the primary part shapes are flat. Liquid wood finishes are applied via automated spray guns in an enclosed environment or spray cabin. The material then can enter an oven or be sanded again depending on the manufacturer’s setup. The material can also be recycled through the line to apply another coat of finish or continue in a system that adds successive coats depending on the layout of the production line. The systems typically used one of two approaches to production.

Hangline approach
In the hangline approach, wood items being finished are hung by carriers or hangers that are attached to a conveyor system that moves the items overhead or above the floor space. The conveyor itself can be ceiling mounted, wall mounted or supported by floor mounts. A simple overhead conveyor system can be designed to move wood products through several wood finishing processes in a continuous loop. The hangline approach to automated wood finishing also allows the option of moving items up to warmer air at the ceiling level to speed up drying process.

Towline approach
The towline approach to automating wood finishing uses mobile carts that are propelled by conveyors mounted in or on the floor. This approach is useful for moving large, awkward shaped wood products that are difficult or impossible to lift or hang overhead, such as four-legged wood furniture.  The mobile carts used in the towline approach can be designed with top platens that rotate either manually or automatically. The rotating top platens allow the operator to have easy access to all sides of the wood item throughout the various wood finishing processes such as sanding, painting and sealing.

See also
Wood stain
Refinishing
Distressing
Danish oil
Xylotechnigraphy

References

 Michael Dresdner (1992). The Woodfinishing Book. Taunton Press. 
 Bob Flexner (1994). Understanding Wood Finishing: How to Select and Apply the Right Finish. Rodale Press

External links

 
 
Woodworking